Silvia de Esteban Niubo (born December 1, 1971 in Santa Cruz de Tenerife) is a Spanish model and beauty queen. she is the second delegate from her country to win the Miss International title. She held the title in 1990, 13 years after Pilar Medina Canadell won in 1977.

References

Living people
Miss International winners
Miss Spain winners
Spanish female models
Spanish beauty pageant winners
1971 births
Miss International 1990 delegates